USS LSM-469 was a  in the United States Navy during World War II. The ship was transferred to Thailand and renamed HTMS Kram (LSM-3).

Construction and career 
LSM-469 was laid down on 27 January 1945 at Brown Shipbuilding Co., Houston, Texas. Launched on 17 February 1945 and commissioned on 17 March 1945.

During World War II, LSM-469 was assigned to the Asiatic-Pacific theater. She took part in the occupation service in the Far East from 20 September 1945 to 11 April 1946.

LSM-469 was decommissioned on 29 August 1946 and later transferred to Thailand on 25 May 1962.

She was struck from the Navy Register.

The ship was commissioned into the Royal Thai Navy on 12 July 1962 and renamed HTMS Kram (LSM-3). She was later redesignated as LSM-732, later in her career.

The ship was decommissioned on 26 February 2002 and to be sunk as an artificial reef off Pattaya on 1 February 2003.

Awards 
LST-469 have earned the following awards:

American Campaign Medal
Asiatic-Pacific Campaign Medal 
Navy Occupation Service Medal 
World War II Victory Medal

Citations

Sources 
 
 
 
 

World War II amphibious warfare vessels of the United States
Ships built in Houston
1945 ships
LSM-1-class landing ships medium
Ships transferred from the United States Navy to the Royal Thai Navy
Ships sunk as artificial reefs